Romania currently has 1,400 MW of nuclear power capacity by means of one active nuclear power plant with 2 reactors, which constitutes around 18% of the national power generation capacity of the country. This makes Romania the 24th largest user of nuclear power in the world.

Cernavodă nuclear plant

In 1977 the Romanian Government signed a contract with AECL to build a five unit nuclear power plant in Cernavodă using Canadian CANDU reactor technology. The heavy water reactor design uses heavy water (produced at Drobeta-Turnu Severin) as its neutron moderator and water from the Danube for cooling. Construction started on the five reactors in 1980.

Currently the plant has two fully operational reactors and another three reactors that are partially finished.
Unit One took 16 years to build, completed in 1996. It produces 705.6 MW of electricity.
Unit Two took 27 years to build, achieving initial criticality in 2007 and produces 706 MW of electricity.
Unit Three and Unit Four were expected to be operational by the year 2015 (thirty-five years after the start of construction) and the total electricity production of the units was to be around 1,500 MW. The total cost of the units is expected to be around US$ 6 billion.
On 7 March 2008, Nuclearelectrica, ArcelorMittal, CEZ, Electrabel, Enel, Iberdrola and RWE agreed to set up a company dedicated to the completion, commissioning and operation of Units 3 and 4. The company is expected to be registered in May 2008.

When four of the five reactors were to be fully functional the Cernavodă Nuclear Power Plant would have produced around 40% of Romania's total electricity needs.

In 2002 and 2006, Romania made efforts to complete unit 3 and 4, respectively.  The cost estimate put completion of both reactors at EUR 2.5 billion, with seven companies investing into the project, including the state run Societatea Nationala Nuclearelectrica.  The six other companies include ArcelorMittal, CEZ, Electrabel, ENEL, Iberdrola, and RWE.  With investment from all these companies, unit 3 would be completed in 2014 and unit 4 in 2015.  In March 2008, the Romanian government suggested that it might build another four-unit power plant by 2020.
The company that operates and maintains the power plant is Nuclearelectrica.

20 January 2011, GDF Suez, Iberdrola and RWE pulled out of the project, following ČEZ which had already left in 2010, citing "Economic and market-related uncertainties surrounding this project, related for the most part to the present financial crisis, are not reconcilable now with the capital requirements of a new nuclear power project".

In November 2015 Nuclearelectrica and the China General Nuclear Power Group signed an memorandum of understanding regarding the construction, operation and decommissioning of Cernavoda 3 and 4.

In February 2020 the prime minister announced that the country would no longer partner with CGN for the project. In October 2020 it was announced that the USA would finance the construction of Cernavoda 3&4, as well as the refurbishment programme of unit 1. In March 2021 Nuclearelectrica said it expects to commission unit 3 by 2031, starting construction in about 2024.The largely-new reactors will be updated versions of the Candu 6, but not the full EC6 version, since the concrete structures are already built. Unit 3 was reported to be 52% completed and 30% for unit 4, though in 2017 the reported figures were 15% and 14%. They would have an operating lifetime of 30 years with the possibility of a 25-year extension. Some 1000 tonnes of heavy water has been produced and is in storage.

Nuclear waste

Currently, nuclear waste is stored at the reactors for up to ten years.  Then the waste is transported to dry storage, which is based on the Macstor system designed by AECL.  The government has conducted studies into a permanent geological repository.

Plans for other power plants 

There are also plans for the construction of a second nuclear power plant in Transylvania that will either have 2 reactors of 1,200 MW each or 4 reactors of 600 MW each with an electricity generating capacity of 2,400 MW and will be constructed after 2020. Currently, several locations for this plant are being considered, some on the Someș River. The French company Areva has been mentioned as a possible constructor for the new plant.

A March 2008 statement by the head of SNN "Nuclearelectrica" said that up to four more units by 2020 at a new site were proposed, and early in 2009 site selection was still under way.  In May it was announced that Târnăveni municipality in Mureș county of Transylvania, and on the Mureș River in central Romania was favoured, with a site in the nearby Sibiu district on the Olt River as second choice. Three sites on the Someș River in Transylvania have also been mentioned, for 2400 MWe of capacity to be built after 2020. Areva has been approached to contribute to planning, with a view to a second plant being commissioned by 2030.

Energy production

See also
List of nuclear reactors#Romania
Energy in Romania

References

External links
http://www.world-nuclear.org/info/inf93.html